Shuichi Yoshida (Yoshida Shūichi; born 26 March 2001) is a Japanese handball player. He competed in the 2020 Summer Olympics.

References

2001 births
Living people
Handball players at the 2020 Summer Olympics
Japanese male handball players
Olympic handball players of Japan